SS James J. Pettigrew (MC contract 874) was a Liberty ship built in the United States during World War II. She was named after J. Johnston Pettigrew, a Confederate general from North Carolina killed during the American Civil War.

The ship was laid down by North Carolina Shipbuilding Company in their Cape Fear River yard on November 24, 1942, and launched on December 24, 1942.  Pettigrew was chartered to Moore-McCormack Lines, Inc., by the War Shipping Administration until entering the James River Fleet of the National Defense Reserve Fleet in January 1946.  At the time she required more than $100,000 of repairs.  The vessel was sold for scrap in 1967.

Awards 
Pettigrew'''s Naval Armed Guard detachment received one battle star for World War II service. On May 11, 1944 while part of convoy UGS-40 Pettigrew'' came under heavy air attack.  The convoy managed to fight off an attack that included bombs, torpedoes, and glide bombs without casualties.

See also

Convoy UGS-40

References 

Liberty ships
Ships built in Wilmington, North Carolina
1943 ships